İlyas Yalçıntaş (born 7 March 1989) is a Turkish singer-songwriter.

Life and career  
Yalçıntaş was born on 7 March 1989 in Erzincan, Eastern Turkey. He is a graduate of Küçükçekmece İMKB Anatolian High School. His breakthrough came in 2014, when he took part in X Factor Türkiye as a contestant, performing the song "İncir", written and composed by his friends İskender Külekçi and Orçun Karamuk. In 2015, he released a new version of the song, rearranged by Behzat Gerçeker & Enbe Orkestrası. The song managed to top Kral Pop and TTNet Müzik charts in Turkey.

After releasing "İncir" as a single in 2015, he released the song "Olmazsa Olmazımsın", for which again he worked with Enbe Orkestrası and Büşra Periz. In 2016, he released his first official album İçimdeki Duman, which consists of the songs that he previously published in 2015. The songs "İncir", "Olmazsa Olmazımsın", "Nefes" and "İçimdeki Duman", and "Bu Nasıl Veda" were all turned into music videos to further promote the album. In May 2018, his duet with Feride Hilal Akın was released under the title "Şehrin Yolu". The song was written by Yalçıntaş and composed by him and Emre Can Yıldız.

Discography

Albums 
 İçimdeki Duman (2016)

Singles 
"Gel Be Gökyüzüm" (2017)
"Yağmur" (feat. Aytaç Kart) (2018)
"Şehrin Yolu" (feat. Feride Hilal Akın) (2018)
"Bilmece" (2018)
"Neredesin Sen" (2019)
"Kirli Kadeh" (2019)
"Farzet" (2019)
"Olur Olur" (2020)
"Dünya Senin" (2020)
"Kalbimin Kapısı" (2020)
"Dönme" (2021)
"Mecnun" (feat. Enbe Orkestrası) (2021)
"Adım Adım" (feat. Ezgi Kosa) (2021)
"Darmadağın" (2021)
"Rüzgarım Seninle Esse" (2022)
"Mask" (feat. Farzad Farzin) (2022)
"Resim" (feat. Faruk Sabancı) (from the album Serdar Ortaç Şarkıları, Vol. 1) (2022)
"Aşk Tohumu" (feat. Alper Atakan) (2022)

Awards

See also 

 Turkish pop music

References

External links 

İlyas Yalçıntaş on Spotify

Living people
1989 births
People from Erzincan
Turkish pop singers
Turkish singer-songwriters
21st-century Turkish singers
21st-century Turkish male singers
Golden Butterfly Award winners